Algenon L. Marbley (born September 19, 1954) is the Chief United States district judge of the United States District Court for the Southern District of Ohio.

Education and career

Born in Morehead City, North Carolina, Marbley received a Bachelor of Arts degree from the University of North Carolina at Chapel Hill in 1976 and a Juris Doctor from the Northwestern University School of Law in 1979. He was in private practice of law in Chicago, Illinois from 1979 to 1980. He was an assistant regional attorney of the United States Department of Health and Human Services from 1980 to 1986, returning to private practice in Columbus, Ohio, from 1986 to 1997 with Vorys, Sater, Seymour and Pease LLP.

Federal judicial service

On July 31, 1997, Marbley was nominated by President Bill Clinton to a seat on the United States District Court for the Southern District of Ohio vacated by John David Holschuh. Marbley was confirmed by the United States Senate on October 27, 1997, and received his commission on November 7, 1997. He became Chief Judge on September 16, 2019.

See also 
 List of African-American federal judges
 List of African-American jurists

References

Sources

|-

1954 births
20th-century American judges
21st-century American judges
African-American judges
Judges of the United States District Court for the Southern District of Ohio
Living people
Northwestern University Pritzker School of Law alumni
People from Morehead City, North Carolina
United States district court judges appointed by Bill Clinton
University of North Carolina at Chapel Hill alumni